The Minuets in G major and G minor, BWV Anh. 114 and 115, are a pair of movements from a suite for harpsichord by Christian Petzold, which, through their appearance in the 1725 Notebook for Anna Magdalena Bach, used to be attributed to Johann Sebastian Bach. These minuets, which are suitable for beginners on the piano, are among the best known pieces of music literature. The 1965 pop song "A Lover's Concerto", of which millions of copies were sold, is based on the first of these Minuets.

History
By the time Johann Sebastian Bach started to visit Dresden, Petzold was well acquainted with several of the city's musicians, including the violinist Johann Georg Pisendel, with whom Bach was also acquainted. Bach gave a concert on that organ when he visited Dresden in September 1725. Petzold died in 1733: as organist of the  he was succeeded by Bach's son Wilhelm Friedemann.

In the Notebook for Anna Magdalena Bach
The second Notebook for Anna Magdalena Bach was started in 1725. It opened with two harpsichord suites, that is, the Partitas BWV 827 and 830, composed and written down by Johann Sebastian Bach. Anna Magdalena Bach likely received the notebook from her husband in the autumn of 1725, as a present for either her birthday (22 September) or their wedding anniversary (3 December). Nos. 3 to 11 in the notebook are keyboard pieces written down by Anna Magdalena, likely shortly after she was given the volume. Petzold's Minuets in G major and G minor, BWV Anh. 114 and 115, are the next two entries in the notebook (Nos. 4 and 5). These pieces may have been brought back from Dresden by Johann Sebastian when he visited this city in September 1725.

Bach likely intended the simple binary dances contained in Anna Magdalena's notebooks, including the Minuets entered without composer indication, as teaching material, likely rather for his younger children than for his wife.

Petzold's harpsichord music
From the early 1720s Petzold owned a state-of-the-art harpsichord manufactured by Silbermann. In Johann Gottfried Walther's Lexicon, published in 1732, Petzold is mentioned as a composer of "good keyboard pieces". Some of Petzold's harpsichord music appeared in 1729 collections:

Heinrich Raphael Krause was a student in Leipzig from 1720, before becoming cantor in Olbernhau in 1725. Johann Benjamin Tzschirich was a student in Grimma when he started to copy harpsichord pieces collected by Krause in an album in 1726. Tzschirich came to study in Leipzig in 1729, and became a lawyer in Bitterfeld in 1736. Meanwhile he had continued to add pieces to his harpsichord music manuscript, including compositions by Bach (part of BWV 914), Friedrich Wilhelm Zachow, Telemann, Johann Kuhnau and others. One of the last pieces he entered, likely around the time when moving to Bitterfeld (1735–1736), was a Suite by Petzold containing, together with eight other movements, the G major/G minor combined Minuet, otherwise only known as Nos. 4 and 5 of Anna Magdalena Bach's second notebook. Tzschirich may have had access to a score of Petzold's Suite via the Bachs.

Description
In Tzschirich's manuscript, the Minuet pair in G major and G minor is preceded by five other movements of Petzold's Suite, respectively a Prelude, an Allemande, a Courante, a Sarabande and a Bourrée. After the double Minuet, Petzold's Suite continues with a Gigue and a Passepied with Trio. According to the manuscript, the Minuets are to be performed da capo, in this order:
  (=first Minuet, G major)
  (=second Minuet, G minor)
  (repeat the first Minuet)
Both the G major and the G minor Menuets, in  time, consist of 32 measures, each with a repeat sign at the end of the 16th measure (for a repeat of the first half of the piece), and another at the end of the Menuet (for a repeat of the second half). There are a few minor differences between these Minuets as they appear in Tzschirich's manuscript and how they are written down in Anna Magdalena's second notebook.

The first eight measures in modern notation:

Reception
In 1880, C. F. Peters published Nos. 4 and 5 of Anna Magdalena Bach's second notebook as two of "twenty easy piano pieces" from that manuscript. The Bach-Gesellschaft published the Minuets in 1894. After the publication of several anthologies, all the pieces of the second notebook were published in a single volume in 1904.

In 1904, Max Seiffert published a description of Tzschirich's harpsichord music manuscript, however, without substantial analysis of its content: the correspondence of Petzold's double Minuet contained in it with the G major/G minor Minuets of Anna Magdalena Bach's notebook remained unnoticed. In 1957, Anna Magdalena's notebooks were published in Vol. V/4 of the New Bach Edition. Without having access to other primary sources for the G major and G minor Minuets than Anna Magdalena Bach's notebook, Georg von Dadelsen, the editor of the New Bach Edition volume, remarked that the Minuets  and 115 appeared to belong together.

Outside the context of scholarly literature, and despite being marked as doubtful in the BWV, the Minuets were still generally considered as compositions by Bach. The melody from the 1965 pop song "A Lover's Concerto", written by American songwriters Sandy Linzer and Denny Randell, was based on the Minuet in G major. The song was recorded by The Toys and reached number 2 in the US Billboard Hot 100 and number 5 in the UK Singles Chart. "A Lover's Concerto" sold more than two million copies and was awarded gold record certification by the R.I.A.A.

In the 1984 film Electric Dreams, the piece is the basis for a duet, or a friendly musical duel, between cellist Madeline and Edgar, the computer. This song from the movie soundtrack, titled "The Duel," was composed and performed by Giorgio Moroder.

Notwithstanding their status as pieces for beginners, the Minuets  and 115 were recorded by renowned performers (on harpsichord unless otherwise indicated), including:
 Gustav Leonhardt recorded "2 Minuets ... BWV Anh. 114 & Anh. 115: Also attributed to Christian Pezold (...)" in September 1988 (issued 1989).
 E. Power Biggs, performing the Minuets on organ, included in The Biggs Bach Book (issued 1990).
 Igor Kipnis, included the Minuets in The Notebook of Anna Magdalena Bach (issued 1992).
 Richard Egarr recorded "2 Minuets, BWV Anh. 114–5 (from Clavier-Büchlein für Anna Magdalena Bach [1725])" in 1995 (issued 1997).

In 1988, Dadelsen published a facsimile of Anna Magdalena's second notebook. Richard Jones published the short pieces, edited with piano fingering, of Anna Magdalena's 1725 notebook in 1997. In 21st-century publications the Minuets BWV Anh. 114 and 115 are usually correctly identified as Petzold's. In the 2010s, digital facsimiles of the Minuets as written down by Anna Magdalena Bach became available at Bach Digital and at the website of the Berlin State Library.

References

Sources
 
 
 
 
 
 
 
  Preface in English and German.

External links
 
 

Bach: spurious and doubtful works
Compositions for harpsichord
Compositions in G major
Compositions in G minor
Articles containing video clips